Hajjiyeh (also Romanized as Ḩājjīyeh and Ḩājīyeh) is a village in Howmeh-ye Gharbi Rural District, in the Central District of Dasht-e Azadegan County, Khuzestan Province, Iran. At the 2006 census, its population was 884, in 136 families.

References 

Populated places in Dasht-e Azadegan County